Wendover, also known as Frontier Nursing Service or Big House, is a historic house and former medical care facility near Hyden, Kentucky.  Built in 1925, it is notable for its association with the American effort to professionalize midwifery, led by Mary Breckinridge (1881-1965).  It was headquarters of the Frontier Nursing Service, an organization which continues today.  Wendover was named a U.S. National Historic Landmark in 1991 for this role.   It now serves as a bed and breakfast inn and retreat operated by the Service's success, Frontier Nursing University.

Description and history
The principal building of the complex now on the property is a 2-1/2 story log structure covered with gabled roofs. It is roughly laid out as two wings joined by a central section, having begun as a traditional dogtrot house. Two large stone chimneys project through the main roof line. Windows are typically of the casement style, with larger windows in the more public spaces of the ground floor.

Mary Breckinridge, a Tennessee native, was exposed from a relatively early age to both midwifery and nursing, formally studying the latter in the early 1900s.  During the First World War she was exposed to rural community health services in Scotland, an idea she thought to transfer to rural parts of the United States.  She chose rural eastern Kentucky in part for its daunting logistical difficulties.  Wendover became her home and a training facility for a network of clinics she established in the region.  The Frontier Nursing Services is now based out of facilities in Hyden, and its training service is now Frontier Nursing University.  The Wendover property now serves as a retreat center and bed-and-breakfast inn.

See also
National Register of Historic Places listings in Leslie County, Kentucky
List of National Historic Landmarks in Kentucky

External links
Wendover Bed & Breakfast

References

University and college buildings completed in 1925
National Historic Landmarks in Kentucky
National Register of Historic Places in Leslie County, Kentucky
1925 establishments in Kentucky
Dogtrot architecture in Kentucky
Log buildings and structures on the National Register of Historic Places in Kentucky
Midwifery in the United States
Bed and breakfasts in Kentucky
History of nursing
Healthcare in Kentucky
Education in Leslie County, Kentucky